José María Fernández Unsáin (10 August 1918 – 18 June 1997) was an Argentine film director, screenwriter, and playwright.

Biography 
Although he studied medicine, Fernández Unsain chose literature as his career.

He was exiled to Mexico after the 1955 Revolución Libertadora, because of his cultural relationship with Eva Perón and The National Theatre or Comedy, Cervantes National Theatre (first director), and the Labour Worker Theatre of the General Confederation of Workers (CGT) (founder with others artists and directors).

He migrated to Mexico in 1958 and worked on the screenplays of hundreds of films over the next several decades, including Sed de amor directed by Alfonso Corona Blake (1958); La diligencia de la muerte directed by Rogelio A. González (1959); De tal palo tal astilla directed by Miguel M. Delgado (1959); Ladrón que roba a ladrón directed by Jaime Salvador (1959); La nave de los monstruos directed by Rogelio A. González (1959); and Sinful. He also directed a number of films in the 1960s and 1970s.

In 1976, Fernández Unsain became the president of the newly formed SOGEM (Sociedad General de Escritores de Mexico), an organization which strives to guarantee the rights of authors. He held this post until his death in 1997.

Fernández Unsain is survived by his widow, actress Jacqueline Andere (he had previously been married to actress Olivia Michelle and to Argentine actress Zoe Ducós), and four children, including daughter Chantal Andere, an actress and singer.

References

External links
 

1918 births
1997 deaths
Argentine people of Basque descent
People from Entre Ríos Province
Argentine emigrants to Mexico